Trinxat is a food from the Pyrenees, principally Andorra and the Catalan comarques of Cerdanya and Alt Urgell. It is made with potatoes, cabbage and pork meat, and resembles bubble and squeak. The name, meaning “mashed” or “chopped”, is the past participle of the Catalan word trinxar, which means "to slice". It is sometimes served with salt herring or eaten on its own with bread.

See also

 List of potato dishes
 List of pork dishes

References

External links
 Trinxat at anglophone.direct.com
  Trinxat at globaladventure.com

Catalan cuisine
Potato dishes
Pork dishes
Andorran cuisine
Cabbage dishes
Bacon dishes